

Seeds
A champion seed is indicated in bold text while text in italics indicates the round in which that seed was eliminated.

  Carlos Moyà (final)
  Àlex Corretja (second round)
  Álbert Costa (second round)
  Alberto Berasategui (second round)
  Thomas Muster (semifinals)
  Magnus Gustafsson (first round)
  Francisco Clavet (first round)
  Gustavo Kuerten (champion)

Draw

External links
 1998 Majorca Open draw

Singles